Eiganes og Våland is a borough of the city of Stavanger which lies in the southwestern part of the large municipality of Stavanger in Rogaland county, Norway. It is located just west of the city centre, north of the lake Mosvatnet, west of the lake Stokkavatnet, and south of the borough of Tasta. The  borough has a population (2019) of 24,070. There are two churches in Eiganes og Våland: Stokka Church and Kampen Church.

Neighbourhoods
Although the borders of "neighbourhoods" do not correspond exactly to the borough borders, Eiganes og Våland roughly consists of the following neighbourhoods: Våland, Eiganes, Kampen, and Stokka.

Politics
Eiganes og Våland borough is led by a municipal borough council. The council consists of 11 members, with the following party allegiances:

References

Boroughs and neighbourhoods of Stavanger